Eleutheroside D is an eleutheroside. An eleutheroside is a compound found in Eleutherococcus senticosus, the Siberian ginseng. Chemically, it is a dimer of sinapyl alcohol glucoside, and is an optical isomer of Eleutheroside E. Eleutheroside D and E are thought to be the most pharmacologically active out of the eleutherosides.

References

External links

chemblink.com

Phenylpropanoid glucosides